Great Southern Bank Arena (originally known as JQH Arena) is an indoor arena in Springfield, Missouri. The arena opened in 2008. It is located on the campus of Missouri State University and is the home of the Missouri State Bears and Lady Bears basketball teams; it is often referred to by MSU students as "the Q".

About
There is a maximum seating capacity of 11,000. Included in the seating capacity are 9,637 chairback seats, 122 seats for permanently disabled guests, 114 loge seats, and 22 private suites. 55 courtside seats are arranged for basketball games and 1,363 bleacher back seats in the end zones are reserved for students. There are 166 public restroom stations (98 for women and 70 for men), six concession stands with 42 points of sale plus 12 additional portable locations, and 2 elevators. Located just off the main lobby area is a team store selling Missouri State University apparel and souvenirs. Maximum seating for concerts with an end-stage is 10,542.

The arena bears the initials of John Q. Hammons, a Springfield-based hotel developer and Missouri State alumnus who donated $30 million for the arena's construction. JQH Arena replaced the Hammons Student Center (also named in honor of its major donor) in terms of function and is connected with the Hammons Student Center via an underground corridor.

The venue underwent a name change in April 2022. Naming rights were purchased by Great Southern Bank for $5.5 million. 

The band Eagles played the inaugural concert at JQH on November 13, 2008, in front of a sold-out crowd of 10,550. In the fall of 2009, the PBR made their first Built Ford Tough Series appearance at the JQH Arena and appeared again in the spring of 2010, and summer of 2019.

GSB Arena currently co-hosts the Missouri State High School Activities Association state basketball semifinals with the Hammons Center. All championship games are played in the arena.

Attendance Records

Concerts
The Eagles - November 13, 2008
Casting Crowns - December 2, 2008 and October 4th, 2021
MercyMe - April 11, 2009 and February 20, 2011
Larry the Cable Guy - May 2, 2009
Jeff Dunham - March 13, 2010
Carrie Underwood - June 15, 2010 and October 28, 2012
Alan Jackson - September 23, 2010
Jason Aldean - October 29, 2010 and February 14, 2020
Trans-Siberian Orchestra - November 5, 2010
Rascal Flatts and Chris Young - March 5, 2011
Francesca Battistelli - April 2, 2011
Elton John - April 16, 2011
Celtic Woman - April 30, 2011
Michael Bublé - June 21, 2011
Miranda Lambert - October 21, 2011, and October 25, 2019
Third Day - November 10, 2011
Trans-Siberian Orchestra November 12, 2011
Lady Antebellum and Josh Kelley - December 10, 2011
MercyMe and Tenth Avenue North (Hawk Nelson) (Rend Collective Experiment) (Sidewalk Prophets) - February 16, 2012
Scott McCready and Brad Paisley - February 25, 2012
Sanctus Real - March 26, 2012
Wiz Khalifa - April 12, 2012
Matthew West and Casting Crowns - April 24, 2012, and October 4th, 2021
Eric Church - May 3, 2012
James Taylor - July 17, 2012, and June 27, 2016
Rascal Flatts - January 12, 2013
Kid Rock with Buckcherry - February 5, 2013
Zac Brown Band - February 16, 2013
Dierks Bentley and Miranda Lambert - April 12, 2013
3OH!3 and Macklemore and Ryan Lewis - April 18, 2013
Bob Dylan - April 24, 2013
Keith Urban - October 20, 2013
Lady Antebellum - December 3, 2013
The Roadshow with Vertical Church Band - February 6, 2014
Kiss with Caleb Johnson - July 23, 2016
Journey and Asia  July 3, 2017
Jim Gaffigan - August 15, 2019
Chris Stapleton - October 3, 2019
 Shinedown with Papa Roach, Asking Alexandria, and Savage After Midnight - October 5, 2019
 Chris Young with Eli Young Band - November 9, 2019

See also
 List of NCAA Division I basketball arenas

References

External links
 

College basketball venues in the United States
Indoor arenas in Missouri
Missouri State Bears and Lady Bears
Sports venues in Springfield, Missouri
Basketball venues in Missouri
2008 establishments in Missouri
Sports venues completed in 2008
Sports venues in Missouri